Ché Trading was an independent UK record label co-founded by Vinita Joshi and Nick Allport, and was responsible for releasing the music of Essex etherealists Disco Inferno. Other artists on their roster included the Tindersticks, Füxa, and Slipstream. Ché was also responsible for two Top 40 hit singles by Lilys, "A Nanny in Manhattan" and Urusei Yatsura's 1997 track "Hello Tiger". The I label is an offshoot of Ché Trading, which specialises in alternative and left field releases.

Discography

References

External links
 Official website
 Official Facebook page

British independent record labels